Solești is a commune in Vaslui County, Western Moldavia, Romania. It is composed of seven villages: Boușori, Iaz, Satu Nou, Solești, Șerbotești, Știoborăni and Valea Siliștei.

References

Communes in Vaslui County
Localities in Western Moldavia